Events from the year 1791 in Denmark.

Incumbents
 Monarch – Christian VII
 Prime minister – Andreas Peter Bernstorff

Events
 10 September – , a brig of 18 guns, is launched from the shipyard at Nyholm in Copenhagen.

Undated
 Døtreskolen af 1791 is founded.

Culture

Art
 Jens Juel paints The Artist and his Wife Rosine, née Dørschel

Births
 5 April – Christian Tuxen Falbe, naval officer and explorer (died 1849)
 19 June – Henriette Jørgensen, actor (died 1847)
 17 December – Birgitte Andersen, stage actor and ballet dancer (died 1875)

Deaths
 2 July – Søren Abildgaard, naturalist, writer and illustrator (born 1718)
 25 November – Magnus Theiste, government official (born 1725)

References

 
1790s in Denmark
Denmark
Years of the 18th century in Denmark